Jaime Gutierrez (born September 12, 1949) is an American politician who served in the Arizona Senate from the 11th district from 1979 to 1993.

References

1949 births
Living people
Democratic Party Arizona state senators